The 2003 Los Angeles Dodgers season was the 114th for the franchise in Major League Baseball, and their 46th season in Los Angeles, California. It was a turbulent season as News Corporation (Fox) was seeking to sell the team. Nevertheless, the Dodgers fell just short of a Wild Card berth, winning 85 games while finishing second in the National League West. The Dodgers pitching staff led baseball in earned run average (3.16), Éric Gagné became the first Dodger to earn the NL Cy Young Award since 1988 as he converted all 55 of his save opportunities. Shawn Green set a new Dodger single season record with 49 doubles and Paul Lo Duca had a 25-game hitting streak.

Offseason
 December 4, 2002: Acquired Todd Hundley and Chad Hermansen from the Chicago Cubs for Mark Grudzielanek and Eric Karros.
 December 16, 2002: Acquired Derek Thompson from the Chicago Cubs for cash.
January 25, 2003: Acquired Daryle Ward from the Houston Astros for Ruddy Lugo.
January 27, 2003: Acquired Jason Romano from the Colorado Rockies for Luke Allen.
January 30, 2003: Ron Coomer was signed as a free agent.

Regular season

Season standings

National League West

Record vs. opponents

Opening Day lineup

Notable transactions

July 14, 2003: Acquired Jeromy Burnitz from the New York Mets for Jose S. Diaz, Victor Diaz and Kole Strayhorn
July 31, 2003: Acquired Robin Ventura from the New York Yankees for Bubba Crosby and Scott Proctor

Roster

Starting Pitchers stats
Note: G = Games pitched; GS = Games started; IP = Innings pitched; W/L = Wins/Losses; ERA = Earned run average; BB = Walks allowed; SO = Strikeouts; CG = Complete games

Relief Pitchers stats
Note: G = Games pitched; GS = Games started; IP = Innings pitched; W/L = Wins/Losses; ERA = Earned run average; BB = Walks allowed; SO = Strikeouts; SV = Saves

Batting Stats
Note: Pos = Position; G = Games; AB = At bats; Avg. = Batting average; R = Runs scored; H = Hits; HR = Home runs; RBI = Runs batted in; SB = Stolen bases

2003 Awards
2003 Major League Baseball All-Star Game
Éric Gagné reserve
Paul Lo Duca reserve
Kevin Brown did not play due to injury
National League Cy Young Award
Éric Gagné
Rolaids Relief Man of the Year
Éric Gagné
TSN National League All-Star
Éric Gagné
TSN NL Pitcher of the Year
Éric Gagné
TSN NL Reliever of the Year Award
Éric Gagné
Players choice: NL Outstanding Pitcher
Éric Gagné
NL Pitcher of the Month
Kevin Brown (May 2003)
NL Player of the Week
Éric Gagné (Aug. 4–10)

Farm system

Major League Baseball Draft

The Dodgers selected 50 players in this draft. Of those, 12 of them would eventually play Major League baseball.

The first round pick was right handed pitcher Chad Billingsley from Defiance High School in Defiance, Ohio. He was a 2009 All-Star and pitched eight seasons with the Dodgers with an 81–61 record and 3.65 ERA in 219 games (190 starts) before missing most of 2013 and all of 2014 with serious arm injuries.

The sixth round pick, outfielder Matt Kemp from Midwest City High School would lead the National League in Home Runs and RBIs in 2011 as well as finishing second in the MVP vote that year.

The draft class also included catcher A. J. Ellis (18th round), who would become the Dodgers starting catcher in 2012.

References

External links
2003 Los Angeles Dodgers uniform
Los Angeles Dodgers official web site
Baseball-Reference season page
Baseball Almanac season page

Los Angeles Dodgers seasons
Los Angeles Dodgers